Panli Lu Station is a station of Line 2 and Line 3 of Suzhou Rail Transit. The station is located in Wuzhong District of Suzhou. It started operation on December 28, 2013, the same time of the operation of Line 2. The Line 3 platforms opened along with the opening of the line in December 2019.

References

Railway stations in Jiangsu
Suzhou Rail Transit stations
Railway stations in China opened in 2013